Jonathan Ward "Jon" Dudas, born July 5, 1968, is the senior vice president, senior associate to the president and secretary of the University of Arizona. He previously served as Under Secretary of Commerce for Intellectual Property and Director of the United States Patent and Trademark Office (USPTO) until January 18, 2009. He was nominated to the position by former President George W. Bush in March 2004 and appointed in July 2004. Dudas previously served as acting Under Secretary and Director, and Deputy Under Secretary and Deputy Director from 2002 to 2004. He is also a member of the board of directors of Conversant Intellectual Property Management.

Background and career
Dudas holds a bachelor of science in finance, summa cum laude, from the University of Illinois and a J.D. degree from the University of Chicago Law School, with honors. He is a member of the Illinois State Bar and the Bar of the United States District Court for the Northern District of Illinois.

Prior to joining the Bush Administration, Dudas served six years as Counsel to the Subcommittee on Courts and Intellectual Property, and Staff Director and Deputy General Counsel for the House Committee on the Judiciary, where he guided enactment of major patent, trademark and copyright policy, including the 1999 American Inventors Protection Act, and the Digital Millennium Copyright Act. He was also instrumental in the passage of the 1996 Trademark Anti-Counterfeiting Consumer Protection Act, a law making it more difficult for seized counterfeit merchandise to re-enter the consumer marketplace. Before his employment with the House of Representatives, Dudas practiced law in the Chicago law firm of Neal Gerber & Eisenberg.

Under Secretary of Commerce for Intellectual Property
As Under Secretary of Commerce for Intellectual Property, Dudas was the lead policy advisor to the Secretary of Commerce, the President of the United States, and Administration agencies on intellectual property matters. Focusing on enhanced intellectual property (IP) protection for large corporations in 2006 Dudas had USPTO IP personnel placed in several high-profile countries, including Brazil, China, Egypt, India, and Thailand.

Director of the USPTO
As director of the USPTO, Dudas was responsible for administering the laws relevant to granting patents and trademarks, and the day-to-day management of the agency's $1.7 billion budget and over 8,000 employees. However, he met the balance of requirements under US law and was appointed on advice and consent of the Senate. He has increased the hiring rate of examiners and increased the amount of monies the PTO retains.

After the PTO
Dudas was a partner at the Washington D.C. office of the law firm Foley & Lardner LLP after leaving the USPTO.  In June 2010, Dudas was selected to be the President of FIRST.

FIRST
On 14 June 2010, Dudas was announced as the new president of FIRST, effective 5 July 2010.

On November 26, 2012, Dudas resigned from his position as FIRST president.

University of Arizona administrator
On June 3, 2014 the University of Arizona announced Dudas as the senior associate to the president and secretary of the university where he continues to serve as the senior vice president and secretary.

Quotes

References

External links
 Biography on the USPTO web site
 Previous biography on the USPTO web site (archive.org)
Presidential Nomination: Jonathan Ward Dudas

Lawyers from Chicago
University of Chicago Law School alumni
Lawyers who have represented the United States government
Gies College of Business alumni
Under Secretaries of Commerce for Intellectual Property
Living people
George W. Bush administration personnel
Illinois Republicans
1968 births